Ohra is a river of Thuringia, Germany. It flows into the Apfelstädt near Hohenkirchen.

See also
Ohra Dam
List of rivers of Thuringia

Rivers of Thuringia
Rivers of Germany